Harlow Aircraft Company was an American aircraft manufacturer at Alhambra Airport, Alhambra, California.

History
The company was founded in 1936 by professor Max B. Harlow to build the Harlow PJC-2 a production version of the PJC-1. The aircraft had been designed and built as a class project at Pasadena Junior College. Harlow had worked with Howard Hughes on the Hughes H-1 racer. Hughes in turn later backed Harlow's enterprise. Flight operations were conducted at Alhambra Airport in the former Western Air Express hangar. The PJC-2 was followed by a military training version the Harlow PC-5. The PC-5 rights were purchased by Cub Aircraft Limited for wartime production. Harlow in turn bought one-third interest in Porterfield Aircraft Corporation. A majority interest in the company was bought by Intercontinent Corporation in 1941 who then sold the company to Vultee Aircraft. The company and facilities were subsequently used to build aircraft assemblies and components throughout the war.

In 1945 the company bought the manufacturing rights to the Interstate Cadet from Interstate Aircraft and Engineering Corporation, which had decided to focus on the production of appliances. Harlow also bought Alhambra Airport for $350,000 that year ($ million in ), with the intention of building the Cadet there, but resold the aircraft rights to Call Aircraft Company in 1946 for $5,000 ($ in ), and the airport to real-estate developers. The company halted operations later that year, although it continued to exist until at least 1954.

Aircraft

See also
 Atlas Aircraft

References

Notes

Bibliography

 The Illustrated Encyclopedia of Aircraft (Part Work 1982-1985), 1985, Orbis Publishing, Page 2099
 Google Bookes extract from U.S.Civil Aircraft Series, Vol 8
 

Defunct aircraft manufacturers of the United States
Alhambra, California
Manufacturing companies established in 1936